Dineth Thimodya (born 20 August 1996) is a Sri Lankan cricketer. He made his first-class debut for Tamil Union Cricket and Athletic Club in the 2016–17 Premier League Tournament on 6 January 2017.

References

External links
 

1996 births
Living people
Sri Lankan cricketers
Galle Cricket Club cricketers
Tamil Union Cricket and Athletic Club cricketers
Place of birth missing (living people)